HNL may refer to:

 Croatian Football League (Hrvatska nogometna liga), the top level of the Croatian football league system
 Daniel K. Inouye International Airport, IATA airport code HNL, in Honolulu, Hawaii, United States
 Hindustan Newsprint Limited, a newsprint manufacturing company in Kerala
 Honduran lempira, ISO 4217 code HNL, the currency of Honduras
 Hum Network Limited, a media company in Karachi, Pakistan